Daniel Aguillón Ramírez (August 11, 1984 – October 18, 2008) was a Mexican featherweight boxer. He died in a Mexico City hospital after a five-day coma induced by a knockout punch by fellow Mexican boxer Alejandro Sanabria during an official fight held on October 15, 2008 in Polanco, Mexico. He was 24.

Death 
Aguillón (16–4–2, 9 KOs) was punched in the jaw in the last minute of the 12th round of the super featherweight bout for the Central American title, sanctioned by the World Boxing Council (WBC) by his opponent Sanabria, he fell unconscious on the floor and was taken to a hospital, but never recovered. The WBC announced it will provide financial support for the family.

References

External links

Boxers from Mexico City
1984 births
2008 deaths
Deaths due to injuries sustained in boxing
Sport deaths in Mexico
Mexican male boxers
Super-featherweight boxers